The Bachfest Leipzig (Leipzig Bach Festival) is a music festival which takes place annually, in the month of June, in the city of Leipzig, where J. S. Bach worked as the Thomaskantor from 1723 until his death in 1750. The current artistic director is Professor Michael Maul.

The city first hosted a festival in 1904, for the Neue Bachgesellschaft, and then formally, since 1908. Since 1999, the festival is organized by the Bach Archive on behalf of the city of Leipzig, each year under a different theme.

Each year there are approximately 100 individual events during the Bach Festival, beginning with an opening concert conducted by the serving Thomaskantor. The final concert is traditionally a performance of Bach's Mass in B minor in the St. Thomas Church.

Themes
 2004: "Bach and the romantic era"
 2005: "Bach and the Future"
 2006: "From Bach to Mozart"
 2007: "From Monteverdi to Bach"
 2008: "Bach and his sons"
 2009: "Bach – Mendelssohn – Reger"
 2010: "Bach – Schumann – Brahms"
 2011: "... " (... to Italian taste)
 2012: "»... " (... a new song – 800 years of music at St. Thomas)
 2013:  (The life of Christ)
 2014:  (The true way)
 2015:  (So glorious you stand, dear city!)
 2016:  (Secrets of Harmony)
 2017:  (A Beautiful New Song – Music and Reformation)
 2018:  (Cycles)
 2019:  (Bach, "Court Composer")

References

External links

Classical music festivals in Germany
Music in Leipzig
Bach festivals
Music festivals established in 1904